Par Patiram is a census town in Balurghat CD Block in Balurghat subdivision of Dakshin Dinajpur district in the state of West Bengal, India.

Geography

Location

Par Patiram is located on the bank of the Atreyee.

In the map alongside, all places marked on the map are linked in the full screen version.

Demographics
As per the 2011 Census of India, Par Patiram had a total population of 3,225, of which 1,607 (50%) were males and 1,618 (50%) were females. Population below 6 years was 355. The total number of literates in Par Patiram was 2,118 (73.80% of the population over 6 years).

Transport
Par Patiram is on State Highway 10 (Balurghat-Hili Highway).

References

Cities and towns in Dakshin Dinajpur district